Parthib Sundar Gogoi (born 30 January 2003) is an Indian professional footballer who plays as a forward for Indian Super League club NorthEast United.

Club career

Indian Arrows
Prior to the 2020–21 season, Parthib was announced as part of I-League side Indian Arrows, the development team for the All India Football Federation. He scored a goal against Aizawl.

NorthEast United
On 5 September, NorthEast United signed Parthib from Indian Arrows on a multiyear deal.

Personal life
Gogoi hails from Assam’s Nazira, a town situated in the district of Sivasagar. His elder brother Pragyan Gogoi is also a professional footballer.

Career statistics

Club

Honours
India U20
SAFF U-20 Championship: 2022

References

External links
 Parthib Sundar Gogoi at the All India Football Federation

2004 births
Living people
People from Sivasagar
Footballers from Assam
Indian footballers
India youth international footballers
Association football forwards
Indian Arrows players
I-League players
Ozone FC players
NorthEast United FC players